Horrues is a village of Wallonia and a district of the municipality of Soignies, located in the province of Hainaut, Belgium.

With the others villages Casteau, Chaussée-Notre-Dame-Louvignies, Naast, Neufvilles, Soignies (town), and Thieusies, they compose the municipality of Soignies since 1977.

Gallery 

Former municipalities of Hainaut (province)